|-
!align=center style=background:DarkBlue colspan=3| Seniors 
|-

|-

|-
!align=center style=background:DarkBlue colspan=3| Juniors
|-

|-

|-
!align=center style=background:DarkBlue colspan=3| Juniors
|-

The United States national ringette team (more commonly known as "Team USA"), is the ringette team representing the United States internationally. America has only one national ringette team, Team USA Senior. It does not have an official national ringette team for the junior division. Team USA Senior is overseen by USA Ringette, a member of the International Ringette Federation, and competes at the World Ringette Championships. The first appearance in international ringette by the United States took place at the first World Ringette Championships in 1990. Team Sweden is Team USA's arch-rival with both teams competing in the President's Pool against Team Czech. Team USA and related activity occurs predominantly within the American state of Michigan.

The majority of Team USA's roster and its coaches consist of individuals who were born in Canada; native-born American ringette players remain rare, with Finnish-born ringette players occasionally rounding out the roster. By 2022 the team had increased the number of American players on the national team. "Team USA is often composed of mostly Canadian athletes that have a US tie, such as citizenship. However, ultimately, we want to have players residing in the US make up the entire team, and we’ve made great progress towards this in the last few years, with almost half of the roster residing in the US recently. We cover quite a few different states now but there is still a lot of work to be done."

History
From 1990–2010 the World Ringette Championships had only one division in which all national teams could compete; the international ringette competition consisted entirely of adults and young adults. The Americans competed against Canadian and Finnish players during that period, and also in a separate division known as the "President's Pool" beginning in 2013. There was an exception in 2016 wherein the senior team competed in both the senior and the junior pools.

While a junior division was added to the WRC program in 2013 (U19), Team USA does not have a junior national team and therefore does not compete.

World championship record

Senior USA

Team USA Senior

The USA Senior team has competed in every World Championships since 1990, with a highest position of third in the Senior Pool. However, they took first place in the President's Pool in 2022, after previously collecting two silver medals.

Team USA Junior

The United States does not have an official national junior ringette team, but a 2012 team was formed for the 2012 World Junior Ringette Championships.

Notable players

  - former American player who played defence. Nouwen started playing ringette in Minnesota when she was at 11 and played as an amateur in several American clubs. She played in Canada's National Ringette League, Finland's  and was a member of the USA national ringette team for the 2000, and 2010 World Ringette Championships, winning the world bronze medal both times. She retired from competition shortly after the 2010 international tournament.

See also

Sam Jacks
Juhani "Juuso" Wahlsten

References

External links
 International Ringette Federation

Ringette
National ringette teams
Ringette
Ringette
Ringette players